The 1914 Ohio gubernatorial election was held on November 3, 1914. Republican nominee Frank B. Willis defeated Democratic incumbent James M. Cox with 46.32% of the vote.

General election

Candidates
Major party candidates
Frank B. Willis, Republican 
James M. Cox, Democratic

Other candidates
James Rudolph Garfield, Progressive
Scott Wilkins, Socialist

Results

References

1914
Ohio
Gubernatorial